Trieste Science+Fiction Festival was founded in 2000 under the name of Science plus Fiction by the Research and Experimentation Centre La Cappella Underground with the ambitious purpose of re-launching the Festival Internazionale del film di fantascienza (International Science Fiction Film Festival), which had been held in the northern Italian city of Trieste in the years 1963–1982.

It is a multidisciplinary event devoted to the realms of the "fantastic", to experimental languages and new technologies in cinema, television and the visual arts. With a program rich in screenings, retrospectives, tributes, conferences and meetings with renown international and national professionals, it aims to explore the whole range of the science fiction world, from cinema to comics, from literature to stage performances.

Todd Brown describes it as "not just one of the world's leading science fiction festivals", but "one of the finest genre events in the world regardless of the genre in question", while Dan Jolin lists it as one of the "14 captivating film festivals in Europe you won't want to miss".

Trieste Science+Fiction Festival annually awards the Asteroide to the best international feature film in competition. Moreover, in cooperation with the Méliès International Festivals Federation – that the festival joined in 2005 – it awards the Méliès d'argent (Silver Méliès) to the best European feature and short films in competition.

History 

In 1963 a group of "young visual poetry artists" – as they were called by Italian poet Giuseppe Ungaretti in a greeting telegram still in the archives of La Cappella Underground – founded the Festival Internazionale del Film di Fantascienza (International Science Fiction Film Festival), a revolutionary event that brought a whole bunch of renown international stars to the city of Trieste. In those years, the festival saw the participation of Arthur C. Clarke, Roger Corman – whose X: The Man with the X-ray Eyes was awarded the Astronave d'argento (Silver Spacecraft) in 1963 -, Riccardo Freda, Forrest J. Ackerman, Umberto Eco (one of the 1963 Jury members) and Brian Aldiss, among others.
In the following years, the event would turn the city of Trieste into a unique stage for genre films, until 1982, when it abruptly came to an end.

In the year 2000, La Cappella Underground decided to pick up the tradition of the festival, presenting to the audience independent film productions, premières and rarities in a new event called Science plus Fiction.

In 2002, in cooperation with Arnoldo Mondadori, editor of the sci-fi and fantasy magazine Urania, the Urania d'Argento (Silver Urania) Career Achievement Award was created. The first Silver Urania Award went to Italian director Pupi Avati. Over the years the Award was bestowed to: Dario Argento (2003), Jimmy Sangster (2004), Lamberto Bava (2005), Enki Bilal and Terry Gilliam (2006), Joe Dante (2007), Ray Harryhausen (2008, via videoconference from London), Roger Corman and Christopher Lee (2009), George A. Romero (2011), Alfredo Castelli (2012), Gabriele Salvatores (2013), Alejandro Jodorowsky (2014), Bruce Sterling (2015), Rutger Hauer (2016), Sergio Martino (2017), and Douglas Trumbull (2018). In 2019 the name of the Award was changed to Asteroide Lifetime Achievement Award and was bestowed to Phil Tippett. and, in 2021, to Abel Ferrara.

In 2004 the Festival picked up a new challenge by restoring the forgotten icon of the event that inspired it: the Asteroide Award, historical prize of the Festival internazionale del film di fantascienza di Trieste. In those years the award to the best film in competition was called Asteroide d'Oro (Golden Asteroid) and it was designed and crafted every year by a different artist (e.g., Nino Perizi and Marcello Mascherini), whose fame and talent was as exceptional as that of the sci-fi films and celebrities taking part in the Festival.

In 2005 Science plus Fiction became part of the Méliès International Festivals Federation, a network including all the main events in the field and aiming at the promotion of the European genre production on a big scale.

In 2007 the festival updated its name to Science+Fiction (now Trieste Science+Fiction Festival) and has since then been characterized by an increasing range of events, not only including film screenings, but also side events related to science fiction (round tables, scientific conferences, concerts and stage performances, art exhibitions and literary events).

In 2009 Trieste Science+Fiction Festival launched the Méliès competition for feature films in addition to the competition of the same name reserved to short films.

The film schedule has always included a wide range of proposals bound to attract both fans and newcomers to the science fiction, horror and fantasy genres. Over the years new sections have been added and as of 2019, besides the official section "Neon" that includes the latest releases and film premières in and out of competition, the Festival presents classic films, short films in and out of competition ("European Fantastic Shorts" and "Fantastic Shorts" sections), "Spazio Italia", a showcase of science fiction and fantasy Italian productions, and science (fiction) documentary films with follow-up meetings ("Futurologia" section). Among the many retrospectives organized by the Festival: Brit Invaders! (2003–2005), on British science fiction from the 1960s to the present day; Marx Attacks! (2007, 2009), a showcase of Russian and Eastern European productions; FantaEspaña (2002), a focus on Spanish science fiction films, curated by Carlos Aguilar; Voyage Fantastique (2006–2008), a journey into French science fiction, in collaboration with the Institut Français in Milan and the Embassy of France in Italy; Fant'America (2009) a tribute to Edgar Allan Poe, two hundred years from his birth.

The event reaches a grand total of more than 20,000 spectators per year.

Awards

Asteroide

Méliès d'argent – feature films

Méliès d'argent – short films

See also 
 Science fiction film

References 

Content in this edit is translated from the existing Italian Wikipedia article at :it:Trieste Science+Fiction Festival; see its history for attribution.

External links 
 sciencefictionfestival.org
 lacappellaunderground.org

Film festivals in Italy
Recurring events established in 2000